The Nets–Raptors rivalry is a National Basketball Association (NBA) rivalry between the Brooklyn Nets and the Toronto Raptors. Both teams play in the Atlantic Division of the Eastern Conference. The rivalry started to get intense in the 2000s, the starting point being in 2004, when All-Star Vince Carter got traded to the Nets. The two teams didn't meet in the playoffs until 2007, where the Nets defeated the Raptors, 4–2. They then met again in 2014, where the Nets beat the Raptors again, but this time in seven games. Six years later, the two teams met again in the playoffs, but this time, the Raptors swept the Nets in four games. The Raptors have a 69–55 advantage against the Nets, and have the longest winning streak, which is 12 games from January 6, 2016 to March 23, 2018.

History

1995–2004: Creation of the Toronto Raptors
The Toronto Raptors were created in 1995 for the NBA to expand the league to Canada. The Raptors had the 7th pick in the 1995 NBA Draft, where they selected Damon Stoudamire. On November 3, 1995, the Raptors played their very first NBA game against the New Jersey Nets. The Raptors outscored the Nets in the first quarter, 21–17, and hence won the contest 94–79. The core of Stoudamire and Alvin Robertson led the team. Robertson had 30 points while Stoudamire had a double-double of 10 points and 10 assists. The Raptors then lost the next seven games of the season. Following the season, the Nets and Raptors played against each other a handful of times per season. The Nets, who were led by Jason Kidd, Kenyon Martin, Keith Van Horn and Todd MacCulloch made the playoffs four times, and went to two straight NBA Finals, losing both appearances. They also were Atlantic Division champions three times. The Raptors, who were led by Vince Carter, Tracy McGrady, Antonio Davis and Dell Curry made the playoffs three times and moved on to the second round once. Once the 2004–05 season started, the Raptors changed divisions from the Central Division to the Atlantic Division, making the two teams division rivals.

2004–2009: The Vince Carter Trade and First Playoff Meeting
In the 2004 NBA offseason, eight-time All-Star and Rookie of the Year Vince Carter showed frustration with the upper management of the Raptors, including Maple Leaf Sports and Entertainment and Raptors president Richard Peddie. General manager Glen Grunwald got fired due to the team not making the playoffs. This led to speculations of Carter wanting to request a trade. In a private meeting, Peddie convinced Carter that he was eager to make a championship team. He told him that he would recruit Julius Erving as the new general manager, but Erving wasn't interested in the job. So, Peddie hired Rob Babcock as general manager instead. This still didn't fix the fact that Carter wanted to get traded. As a result, on December 17, 2004, Carter's request was granted, getting traded to the New Jersey Nets for Alonzo Mourning, Aaron Williams, Eric Williams and two first-round draft picks. Mourning didn't even suit up for the Raptors, while Eric and Aaron Williams didn't play well during their short tenure. This teams up Carter with 10-time All-Star Jason Kidd.

Since the trade, Carter was betrayed by Raptors fans. On April 15, 2005, in his first game in Toronto, Carter was booed every time he touched the ball. Fans burned Carter's jerseys and merchandise, and carried No. 15 baby bibs, 'FUVC' T-shirts, and other prized possessions that labelled Carter as "Wince" and "immature". Though, despite all the hate from the fans, Carter still managed to score 39 points and grab nine boards in his first game back with Toronto, which ended up being a victory to the New Jersey Nets.

There were a lot of intense games between the Nets and Raptors while Vince Carter was with the team. Every time he visited Toronto, he got booed and double-teamed whenever he touched the ball. Notable games include one on November 4, 2005, where the Nets won by 10 points in Toronto. Even though Richard Jefferson was the leading scorer, getting 35 points, 11 rebounds and five assists, Vince Carter, despite getting booed by the fans, got himself 20 points, seven rebounds and six assists in 40 minutes of action. After the game, when Carter was asked about the boos, he said, "It’s beautiful. It doesn’t bother me at all. I enjoy it." On January 8, 2006, Carter and the Nets beat the Raptors by one point after Carter made a fadeaway three at the buzzer. Carter finished the game with 42 points and 10 rebounds and led the Nets to their 10th straight victory. After the game, New Jersey Nets player Lamond Murray said, "To stick a dagger in their heart right when they thought they
were going to win it, it don't get no better than that. That's sweet revenge."

On April 21, 2007, the two teams met in their first playoff matchup in the first round of the 2007 NBA playoffs. The crowd of Toronto still showed utter disrespect of Carter's betrayal, so he was booed and double-teamed every time he had the ball. In Game 1, the game was at Toronto, thus the Raptors had home court advantage. The Nets won the game, where Richard Jefferson led in scoring with 28 points. In Game 2, the Raptors pulled off the victory, where Anthony Parker had 26 points while Carter had 19 points and 11 rebounds for New Jersey. The Nets then took Games 3 and 4 at home, where Carter led in scoring for both games, having 37 and 27 points, respectively. In Game 5, the Raptors took a 20-point lead after the first quarter to take the victory. The Nets did have a chance to come back, as the lead was just two once regulation ended. Boštjan Nachbar attempted a three-pointer at the buzzer that would've won the game, but it missed. In Game 6, Toronto had a chance to force a Game 7 with the win. They were up by one point with under a minute to play in regulation, but Richard Jefferson made a game-winning layup with 8 seconds remaining. Toronto tried a buzzer-beater, but Jefferson intercepted the pass to give the Nets the series victory. Jefferson had 24 points for the Nets, while Chris Bosh had 23 points for the Toronto Raptors. This series was the only series in the first round that didn't result in a full sweep.

On November 21, 2008, the New Jersey Nets won a thriller against the Toronto Raptors. Vince Carter led the team with 39 points, nine rebounds and six assists while scoring 12 consecutive points in the 4th quarter, hitting a last-second three to force overtime, and finishing an alley-oop off an inbounds pass to secure the victory. Devin Harris, Carter's teammate who finished with 30 points for the night, called his performance "incredible." Chris Bosh of the Raptors had a solid game, getting 42 points and nine rebounds, but it wasn't enough for the win. On January 28, 2009, the Raptors had a close win against the Nets themselves. They won by one point, where Anthony Parker had 21 points while Bosh had 18 points. Despite Carter having 27 points in this game, the Raptors still edged out the victory.

On June 25, 2009, Carter was traded, along with Ryan Anderson to the Orlando Magic for Rafer Alston, Tony Battie and Courtney Lee, ending his five-year stint with the New Jersey Nets.

2009–2014: Rivalry Dies Down

After Vince Carter left the Nets during the 2009 offseason, the rivalry started to die down. The Nets lost Jason Kidd on February 13, 2008 in a trade with the Dallas Mavericks. Without the Carter and Kidd duo, the Nets were led by Brook Lopez, Devin Harris, Deron Williams, and Joe Johnson. Since then, the Nets only made the playoffs once in 2012–13. On April 30, 2012, the Nets relocated from New Jersey to Brooklyn, becoming the Brooklyn Nets.

Chris Bosh left the Raptors for free agency in the 2010 offseason and ended up going to the Miami Heat to team up with LeBron James and Dwyane Wade. In the 2009 NBA Draft, the Raptors selected DeMar DeRozan with the 9th pick. On July 11, 2012, the Raptors traded Gary Forbes and a future first-round pick to the Houston Rockets for Kyle Lowry. The Raptors didn't make the playoffs from 2008–09 to 2012–13.

The Nets debuted their team as the Brooklyn Nets on November 3, 2012, and they were versing the Toronto Raptors. The Nets won by seven points. Brook Lopez was the leading scorer with 27 points for the Nets. Kyle Lowry had 28 points, eight rebounds and eight assists, while DeMar DeRozan had 25 points for the Raptors.

2014–2019: Masai Ujiri Incident and Second Playoff Meeting
On June 28, 2013, the Nets acquired Paul Pierce and Kevin Garnett in a trade with the Boston Celtics. Adding Garnett and Pierce to a core of Johnson, Lopez and Williams, the 2013–14 Nets finished with a 44–38 record, which was enough to make the sixth seed for the Eastern Conference. The Raptors, on the other hand, depended on the rise of DeMar DeRozan and Kyle Lowry. They finished a 48–34 record, the third seed of the Eastern Conference.

On April 19, 2014, the two teams met for their second playoff meeting in the first round of the 2014 NBA playoffs. Game 1 gave the Raptors home-court advantage, but the Nets stole the game thanks to Pierce's clutch play during the game. Joe Johnson and Deron Williams both had 24 points that game. In Game 2, the Raptors led by 11 points in the first half in order to win the game at home to tie the series up. DeMar DeRozan had 30 points for the Raptors. In Game 3, the Nets led by 15 points with almost 5 minutes left before the Raptors caught up. Raptors forward Patrick Patterson almost forced overtime, but he missed two crucial free throws, giving the Nets the victory. Pierce had 22 points for the Nets. In Game 4, the Raptors built a 17-point lead in the first half before the Nets tied it up going into the fourth quarter. The Raptors finished the game on a 9–0 run, and won the game. DeRozan had 24 points for the Raptors. In Game 5, the Raptors led in the first three quarters, but the Nets stormed back in the fourth quarter. The Nets had a chance to force overtime, but forward Andray Blatche threw a pass that resulted in a backcourt violation, giving the Raptors the win. Kyle Lowry had 36 points for the Raptors. In Game 6, the Nets blew out the Raptors to force a Game 7. Williams had 23 points for the Raptors. In a decisive Game 7, the game was very close until the closing minutes. Kyle Lowry had the chance to win the series with the Nets leading by one, but Paul Pierce blocked his shot, giving the Nets the series victory. Johnson had 28 points for the Nets, while Lowry had 28 points for the Raptors.

Before the series started, there was "rampant speculation" that the Nets have tanked to play the third-seed Raptors instead of the fourth-seed Bulls. On April 19, 2014, before Game 1 of the first round game against the two teams, Raptors general manager Masai Ujiri at a fan rally shouted, "F--- Brooklyn!" to the crowd at the rally. As a result, NBA Commissioner Adam Silver fined Ujiri $25,000. During halftime of Game 1, Ujiri apologized for his actions stating, "Wrong choice of words. I apologize to kids out there and to the Brooklyn guys." But, he still didn't hide the fact that he hates the team, stating, "You know how I feel, I don't like 'em." Eric Adams, the Brooklyn Borough President, released a statement to respond to Ujiri's comment saying: "It’s unfortunate that the Raptors’ GM felt so desperate facing against our Nets that he would throw profanity around discussing our beloved borough, but I can’t say that I’m surprised. After all, Brooklyn is a classier place. Just compare Babs to Biebs or spend some time with their... colorful mayor. Still we spread love; it is, after all, the Brooklyn way."

After the second playoff meeting, the rivalry died down once again. The Nets made the playoffs again in 2014–15, but after that the group started going their own ways. Paul Pierce left the Nets to sign with the Washington Wizards on July 17, 2014. Kevin Garnett waived his no-trade clause in order to get traded to the Minnesota Timberwolves on February 19, 2015. Deron Williams signed with the Mavericks on July 14, 2015. Joe Johnson signed with the Heat on February 27, 2016. Brook Lopez stayed with the Nets the longest, but later got traded to the Los Angeles Lakers on June 22, 2017 for D'Angelo Russell. With Russell, the Nets made the playoffs once in 2018–19, but lost in the first round.

The Raptors kept on growing. They made six-straight playoff appearances from 2013–14 to 2018–19. They won the Atlantic Division five times, and had four-straight 50-win seasons. They drafted and picked up great players like Norman Powell, Pascal Siakam, Fred VanVleet and OG Anunoby. On July 18, 2018, the Raptors traded All-Star DeMar DeRozan and Jakob Poeltl to the San Antonio Spurs for two-time Defensive Player of the Year Kawhi Leonard and NBA champion Danny Green. With Leonard, Lowry, Green, and great improvement from Siakam, VanVleet and others, the Raptors went to the NBA Finals and won the franchise's first NBA championship.

2019–present: Durant, Harden, Irving and Third Playoff Meeting
During the 2019 offseason, the Nets signed six-time All-Star and NBA champion Kyrie Irving in free agency. Irving only played 20 games in the 2019–20 season because he had a right shoulder injury. The Nets also signed 10-time All-Star and two-time NBA champion Kevin Durant as he announced that he planned to sign with the Nets after the July moratorium ended. They acquired him in a sign-and-trade deal that sent All-Star standout D'Angelo Russell to Golden State. Durant did not play in the 2019–20 season due to his achilles injury in the 2019 NBA Finals. They also signed former All-Star DeAndre Jordan to a four-year $40 million deal. Jordan is a close friend to Durant and Irving. Starting January 15, the Raptors won 15 straight games to have a franchise-high winning streak. But, on February 12, the Raptors ended their winning streak in a 101–91 loss against the Nets.

On August 17, 2020, the Toronto Raptors and Brooklyn Nets had their third playoff meeting in the ESPN Wide World of Sports Complex due to the COVID-19 pandemic. The Raptors won Game 1 134–110. Forward Timothé Luwawu-Cabarrot had 26 points for the Nets, while Fred VanVleet had 30 points and 11 assists for the Raptors. In Game 2, despite the Nets leading 53–50 after the first half, the Raptors won the game 104–99. Garrett Temple had 21 points for the Nets, while VanVleet and Norman Powell had 24 points each for the Raptors. This was the closest game of the series. Game 3 was another blowout, with the Raptors winning 117–92. Pascal Siakam had 26 points for the Raptors, while Nets guard Tyler Johnson had 23 points. The Raptors ended the series in Game 4, beating the Nets 150–122. They broke a playoff record with 100 bench points in a single game. Powell had 29 points for the Raptors, while Caris LeVert had 35 points for the Nets. The Raptors couldn't advance past the second round though, as the team got eliminated by the Boston Celtics in seven games.

On September 3, 2020, the Nets hired Steve Nash as their next head coach. This was the 27th head coach signing for the Nets, making Nash the second Canadian head coach in NBA history.

On January 14, 2021, former MVP and eight-time All-Star James Harden was traded to the Nets in a blockbuster four-team trade. This intensified the rivalry as Brooklyn elevated their championship-level roster.

On February 5, 2021, the Nets and Raptors had their first regular-season game of the 2020–21 NBA season. The Raptors ended up winning the game, 123–117. This was the first time that Kevin Durant played the Raptors since losing in the 2019 NBA Finals with the Golden State Warriors. Siakam led the Raptors with 33 points, while Lowry added 30 points. The trio of Durant, Harden and Irving struggled throughout this game. Harden had 17 points and 12 assists, while Irving had 15 points. In this game, Durant went off the bench for the first time in his career, because of health and safety protocol, but was later ushered out of the game. He had eight points in 19 minutes.

On March 8, 2021, the Nets signed six-time All-Star Blake Griffin to a contract for the rest of the season after getting bought out by the Detroit Pistons, further intensifying the rivalry and the hopes to win a championship.

On March 29, 2021, the Nets signed seven-time All-Star LaMarcus Aldridge to a rest of the season contract after the San Antonio Spurs bought him out. After this signing, the Nets had 41 All-Star appearances and 31 All-NBA appearances on their roster.

On April 15, 2021, after playing only five games with the Nets with averages of 12.8 points, 4.8 rebounds, 2.6 assists and 2.2 blocks per game with .521/.800/1.000 shooting splits, Aldridge announced his retirement from his 15-year NBA career due to his struggling heart condition. This lost some frontcourt depth for the Nets as a result, however on September 3, 2021, it was announced Aldridge would come out of retirement after signing a one-year $2.6 million contract with the Nets.

On November 7, 2021, the visiting Nets defeated the Raptors 116-103, taking their first victory in Toronto since February 4, 2015 when they won 109-93.

Head-to-head

Statistics

Common individuals

Players
The following players have played for both the Nets and the Raptors in their careers:

Quincy Acy – Raptors (–), Nets (–)
Hassan Adams – Nets, Raptors
Rafer Alston – Raptors, Nets
Alan Anderson – Raptors (–), Nets (–)
Andrea Bargnani – Raptors (–), Nets
Benoit Benjamin – Nets (–), Raptors
Anthony Bennett – Raptors, Nets
Damone Brown – Raptors, Nets
DeMarre Carroll – Raptors (–), Nets (–)
Vince Carter – Raptors (–), Nets (–)
Chris Childs – Nets (–) Raptors (–)
William Cunningham – Raptors, Nets
Lloyd Daniels – Nets, Raptors
Ed Davis – Raptors (–), Nets
Hubert Davis – Raptors, Nets
Derrick Dial – Nets, Raptors
Reggie Evans – Raptors (–), Nets (–)
Sundiata Gaines – Raptors, Nets (–)

Rondae Hollis-Jefferson – Nets (–), Raptors
Kris Humphries – Raptors (–), Nets (–)
Jarrett Jack – Raptors (–), Nets (–)
Linton Johnson – Nets, Raptors
Jeremy Lin – Nets (–), Raptors
Jamaal Magloire – Nets, Raptors
Tony Massenburg – Raptors, Nets
Jérôme Moïso – Raptors (–), Nets
Eric Montross – Nets, Raptors (–)
Lamond Murray – Raptors (–), Nets
Dan O'Sullivan – Nets, Raptors
Luis Scola – Raptors, Nets
Reggie Slater – Raptors (–), Nets
Ben Uzoh – Nets, Raptors
Greivis Vásquez – Raptors (–), Nets
Aaron Williams – Nets (–), Raptors (–)
Eric Williams – Nets, Raptors (–)
Antoine Wright – Nets (–), Raptors

Others
Sam Mitchell – Raptors (2004–08 head coach), Nets (2010–12 assistant coach)
Stan Albeck – Nets (1983–85 head coach; 1995–96 assistant coach), Raptors (2000–02 assistant coach)
Tony Brown – Nets (1986–87 player; 2014–16 assistant coach; 2016 interim head coach), Raptors (2003–04 assistant coach)
P.J. Carlesimo – Raptors (2010–11 assistant coach), Nets (2011–12 assistant coach; 2012–13 interim head coach)
Johnny Davis – Nets (1997–99 assistant coach), Raptors (2011–13 assistant coach)
Jerry Stackhouse – Nets (2012–13 player), Raptors (2015–16 assistant coach)
Brendan Suhr – Nets (1992–94 assistant coach), Raptors (1996–97 assistant coach)

See also
National Basketball Association rivalries
History of the Brooklyn Nets
History of the Toronto Raptors

References

National Basketball Association rivalries
Brooklyn Nets
Toronto Raptors